Tsitsi Mairosi is a Zimbabwean footballer who plays as a midfielder. She has been a member of the Zimbabwe women's national team.

Club career
Mairosi has played for Cyclone in Zimbabwe.

International career
Mairosi capped for Zimbabwe at senior level during the 2011 COSAFA Women's Championship.

References

Living people
Zimbabwean women's footballers
Women's association football midfielders
Zimbabwe women's international footballers
Year of birth missing (living people)